Zephyrhills Municipal Airport  is a public use airport in Pasco County, Florida, United States. It is owned by the City of Zephyrhills and located one nautical mile (2 km) southeast of its central business district. This airport is included in the National Plan of Integrated Airport Systems for 2011–2015, which categorized it as a general aviation facility.

History 
Opened in January 1942, the airport was used by the United States Army Air Forces, specifically the Army Air Forces School of Applied Tactics (AAFSAT) tactical combat simulation school headquartered at Orlando Army Air Base. The military presence at the airport ended on October 31, 1944, and, in 1947, the airport was deeded to the city, which has run it ever since.

Facilities and aircraft 
Zephyrhills Municipal Airport covers an area of 813 acres (329 ha) at an elevation of 90 feet (27 m) above mean sea level. It has two runways with asphalt surfaces: 5/23 is 5,000 by 100 feet (1,524 x 30 m) and 19/01 is 4,694 by 100 feet (1,431 x 30 m).

For the 12-month period ending December 11, 2009, the airport had over 49,000 aircraft operations, an average of 135 per day: 98% general aviation, and 1% air taxi. At that time there were 121 aircraft based at this airport: 105 single-engine and 9 multi-engine airplane, 6 helicopter, and 1 ultralight.

Skydiving 
This airport has a long history of skydiving, possibly the longest continuous history of skydiving at any U.S. airport. Skydive City, Inc., founded in 1990, operates a skydiving center, or drop zone, on the southeast side of the airport. The predecessor drop zone was Phoenix Parachute Center, operated by George Kabeller, just north of the current drop zone. Prior to that, a drop zone was operated on the southwest side of the airport. Jim Hooper became the manager of Zephyrhills Parachute Center in December, 1976. Si Fraser owned the Zephyrhills Parachute Center. The drop zone was previously managed by Searles.

Skydiving accidents 
On March 23, 2013, two skydivers at Skydive City, instructor, Orvar Arnarson, 41, and student Andrimar Pordarson, 25, were found dead after their reserve parachutes did not inflate completely before impact.

Accidents and incidents 
 On April 20, 1993, Douglas C-47B N8056 of Phoenix Air was written off in a wheels-up landing at Zephyrhills following an engine failure while engaged in a parachuting flight based at the airport. An investigation by the NTSB found that the aircraft should have been able to climb on one engine. The pilot's type rating for the DC-3 was suspended following the accident with the requirement that he should pass a Federal Aviation Administration proficiency check before it was restored.
On May 14, 2001, a Cessna 177 Cardinal lost engine power while enroute to Zephyrhills from Key West. The pilot was unable to regain power, and the aircraft impacted terrain one mile south of Zephyrhills. No fuel was recovered from the fuel system nor observed around the accident site, and the probable cause of the crash was found to be fuel exhaustion due to the pilot's failure to adequately plan for fuel preflight, leading to a subsequent loss of engine power. The pilot and three passengers received minor injuries.
On September 1, 2002 a Gruber Tiger crashed into a vacant house after takeoff from Zephyrhills. The two occupants were killed. Instrument meteorological conditions prevailed at the time, and witnesses say the pilot looked as if he was trying to circle to land back at the airport.
On August 28, 2007, an ultralight aircraft crashed after takeoff from Zephyrhills. Both on board died.
On October 15, 2018, a Hummel Ultracruiser crashed after takeoff from Zephyrhills due to engine power loss. The probable cause was found to be the pilot's failure to activate the plane's auxiliary fuel pump, resulting in fuel starvation and total loss of engine power. Contributing to the accident was the impairing effect of the pilot's medication on his performance. The sole pilot on board received serious injuries.

See also 
 List of airports in the Tampa Bay area

References

External links 
 Zephyrhills Municipal Airport at City of Zephyrhills website
 Aerial image as of May 2002 from USGS The National Map
 

Airports in the Tampa Bay area
Transportation buildings and structures in Pasco County, Florida
Airports established in 1942
1942 establishments in Florida